The 2011 Subway Fresh Fit 500 was a NASCAR Sprint Cup Series stock car race held on February 27, 2011 at Phoenix International Raceway in Avondale, Arizona. Contested over 312 laps, it was the second race of the 2011 season and was won by Jeff Gordon for Hendrick Motorsports. Kyle Busch of Joe Gibbs Racing finished in second, while Gordon's teammate, Jimmie Johnson, finished third.

Carl Edwards led the first lap from pole position ahead of Kurt Busch who started second on the grid. The race was caution free until lap 29 (debris), and then 48 laps later a multiple crash occurred involving 13 drivers. Later there were several lead changes, and another four cautions. With nine laps remaining, Gordon took the lead from Kyle Busch to win his first race of the season, his first in more than 60 races.

There were eight cautions and 29 lead changes among 12 different drivers during the race. Gordon's win moved him to sixth position in the drivers' championship, 15 points behind leader Kyle Busch and one ahead of Bobby Labonte in seventh. In the Manufacturers' Championship, Toyota, Ford and Chevrolet had 12 points, four ahead of Dodge. A total of 75,000 people attended the race, and 10.36 million watched it on television.

Report

Background

Phoenix International Raceway is one of five short tracks to hold NASCAR races; the others are Richmond International Raceway, Dover International Speedway, Bristol Motor Speedway, and Martinsville Speedway. The track's turns were banked from 9 to 11 degrees, while the front stretch, the location of the finish line, was banked at 3 degrees. The back stretch had a 9 degree banking. The racetrack has seats for 76,800 spectators.

Before the race, Carl Edwards was leading the Drivers' Championship with 42 points, and David Gilliland stood in second with 41 points. Bobby Labonte followed in third also with 41 points, one ahead of Kurt Busch and two ahead of Juan Pablo Montoya in fourth and fifth. In the Manufacturers' Championship, Ford was leading with nine points, three points ahead of their rival Toyota. Dodge, with 4 points, was one point ahead of Chevrolet in the battle for third. Ryan Newman was the race's defending winner.

Practice and qualifying 

Two practice sessions were held before the race on Friday. The first session lasted 80 minutes long, while the second was 85 minutes long. Kurt Busch was quickest with a time of 26.366 seconds in the first session, more than five-tenths of a second faster than Jeff Burton. Denny Hamlin was just off Burton's pace, followed by Kevin Harvick, Kyle Busch, and Brad Keselowski. Kasey Kahne was seventh, still within a second of Kurt Busch's time. Also in the session, Trevor Bayne collided into the wall, so the team had to go to their back-up car. In the second practice session, Kyle Busch was fastest with a time of 26.454 seconds, only one-hundredth of a second quicker than second-placed David Ragan. Edwards took third place, ahead of Jamie McMurray, Greg Biffle and Martin. Newman only managed seventh place.

Forty-four cars were entered for qualifying, but only forty-three raced because of NASCAR's qualifying procedure. Edwards clinched his eighth pole position during his career, with a time of 26.224 seconds, which was a new track record. He was joined on the front row of the grid by Kurt Busch. Kahne qualified third, Kyle Busch took fourth, and Smith started fifth. Joey Logano, Martin Truex Jr., McMurray, Keselowski, and Biffle rounded out the first ten positions. The driver who failed to qualify for the race was Brian Keselowski, who had a time of 27.431 seconds.

Race
The race, the second in the season, began at 3:00 p.m. EST and was televised live in the United States on Fox. Phoenix International Raceway Chaplain Ken Bowers began pre-race ceremonies, by giving the invocation. Actress Emmy Rossum then performed the national anthem, and Olympian Apolo Anton Ohno gave the command for drivers to start their engines. Before the start of the race, a competition caution was scheduled for the 40th lap in the race.

Edwards retained his pole position lead into the first corner, followed by Kurt Busch, who started second. However, by the end of the first lap, Busch was the leader. Two laps later, Edwards fell to the third position, as Kyle Busch passed him. On the fifth lap, Logano moved into the fourth position. On the following lap, Kyle Busch became the leader after passing his brother Kurt. By lap eight, Kurt Busch had fallen to third once Edwards overtook him for second. On lap nine, McMurray moved to sixth, as Keselowski fell to 11th. Ten laps later, Edwards reclaimed the first position, as the first caution was given because of debris on the track. The front-runners made pit stops during the caution, so Kurt Busch became the leader. At the lap 26 restart, Kurt Busch was the leader, as Joe Nemechek retired from the race. By the following lap, Hamlin had moved up to the second position, as Brian Vickers claimed third. On the 32nd lap, Hamlin became the leader. Two laps later, Robby Gordon spun sideways, prompting the second caution to be given. The caution was announced to replace the competition caution. Most of the front runners made pit stops during the caution. At the lap 38 restart, Edwards was the leader, ahead of Clint Bowyer and Kurt Busch.

On the following lap, Bowyer fell to third. At the end of lap 45, Edwards remained the leader, ahead Kurt Busch and Burton. By the 48th lap, Gordon had moved up 15 positions since the beginning of the race. On the 50th lap, the third caution was given after Bayne collided with the wall, sustaining major damage. Most drivers made pit stops during the caution. At the lap 55 restart, Kurt Busch was the leader, while Edwards fell to 15th. On lap 56, Matt Kenseth up moved to second, as Tony Stewart up moved to the third position. On the following lap, Marcos Ambrose moved up to the fifth position. On the 67th lap, the caution was given because of an accident involving 13 drivers. Afterward, the red flag was waved to help the officials to continue removing debris. At the lap 72 restart, Hamlin was the leader, ahead of Newman, and Menard. Dale Earnhardt Jr. had to restart last, after getting a penalty for excessive speed on pit row. Three laps later, Newman overtook the lead after passing Hamlin, as Gordon moved up to second. On the 77th lap, Gordon passed Newman to become the leader, as his teammate Johnson passed Kyle Busch to move the 11th position. On the following lap, Hamlin fell to third. On the next lap, Stewart passed Hamlin to claim third.

By lap 84, Gordon had a 1.5-second lead over Newman; however, after one lap, Newman reclaimed the position. Gordon continued to lose positions as Stewart moved to second. On lap 91, Stewart passed Newman to move to the first position. Four laps later, Truex Jr. moved up to the third position. At lap 98, Stewart remained the leader, followed by Newman, Gordon, and Truex. After the 100th lap, Stewart maintained a 1.8-second lead. Four laps later, Gordon moved to the second position. On lap 109, Johnson claimed the sixth position, as Bowyer and Robby Gordon returned to the race. On the 116th lap, both David Reutimann and Edwards returned to the race, after being in the garage. On lap 125, Gordon reclaimed the first position from Stewart. Two laps later, Ragan collided with the wall, prompting the sixth caution to be given. During the caution, most of the front-runners made pit stops. At the lap 133 restart, Stewart was the leader followed by Gordon, Johnson, Kurt Busch, and Harvick.

Six laps later, Vickers returned to the race, as Gordon passed Stewart for the first position. On lap 144, Bowyer returned to the race. Four laps later, Allmendinger moved into the ninth position. On the 150th lap, Kurt Busch moved the fourth position.  By lap 160, Hamlin moved to eleventh, while Allmendinger moved down to tenth. Twelve laps later, Kyle Busch passed his brother Kurt for the fourth position, as Stewart claimed first. On the 176th lap, Johnson moved to the second position. Eight laps later, Johnson became the leader, as Stewart made a pit stop. On lap 190, Johnson, Jeff Gordon, Newman, Kurt Busch and Hamlin made a pit stop, and Kenseth became the leader. After the green flag pit stops concluded, Johnson continued to be the leader, ahead of Stewart, Gordon, Kyle Busch, and Harvick. By the 201st lap, Stewart fell to fourth, as Gordon and Kyle Busch moved up to the second and third positions.

Four laps later, Gordon passed Johnson to become the leader. On lap 218, the seventh caution was given after Logano's engine failed. Most of the front-runners made pit stops during the caution. At the lap 225 restart, Gordon was the leader, ahead of Kyle Busch, Harvick, and Stewart, while Johnson restarted in ninth, after having an 18-second pit stop. By lap 236, Johnson had moved up to the fifth position. Four laps later, Dale Earnhardt Jr. made pit stops because of a loose wheel. By lap 244, Gordon had a 1.1 second lead over Kyle Busch. Gordon continued to increase his lead over the second position, while Martin passed Menard for the 11th position. On the following lap, Stewart moved into the third position. By the 277th lap, Gordon had a 1.8 second lead over Kyle Busch in second. On lap 282, Kyle Busch made a pit stops, one lap before Gordon, Stewart, and Harvick made pit stops. On lap 284, Johnson made a pit stop, as the eighth caution was given after Andy Lally collided with the wall. At the lap 290 restart, Stewart was the leader, ahead of Kyle Busch, Gordon, and Johnson.

On the following lap, Kyle Busch became the leader, as Stewart fell to third. On the 294th lap, Johnson passed Stewart to claim the third position. Nine laps later, Gordon passed Kyle Busch to become the leader. Gordon maintained the lead to win his first race of the 2011 season. Kyle Busch finished second, ahead of Johnson in third and Harvick in fourth. Newman clinched the fifth position, after starting 14th.

Post-race

Gordon appeared in victory lane after his victory lap to start celebrating his first win of the season, and his second Sprint Cup win at Phoenix International Raceway, in front of a crowd of 75,000 people. "I was feeling the emotions, but to see (the fans) react like that. Then the push truck pushed me around and to see them all the way down (the frontstretch) doing that, I was like, ‘I don't know if I've ever experienced something like that.’ And that to me made it all worth it right there to have that feeling," said Gordon of his triumph.

Kyle Busch, who finished second, said, "He was on a mission today, that's for sure. When Jeff Gordon has a good car and he has the opportunity to beat you, he's going to beat you. He's my hero. I've always watched him and what he's been able to accomplish over the years." In the subsequent press conference, pole position winner, Edwards, stated his frustration at his accident, "I’m not exactly sure what happened. I’ll have to talk to Kyle about it. I thought at first he was just frustrated and he turned left to get back in line and he didn’t know I was there, but I watched the tape and I think he really did get loose. He hit me hard and I was left with nothing. I got rammed to the infield." Rick Hendrick, the owner of Hendrick Motorsports, expressed his enjoyment of winning the race, stating, "When you're a champion like Jeff Gordon, you know you can still do it, (even) when people overlook you. He's been right there but he hasn't had that edge. I think we're going to see a lot of momentum out of that team right now."

Busch also commented, "When Jeff Gordon has a good car and he's got the opportunity to beat you, he's going to beat you, there's no doubt about that. He's my hero and I've always watched him and what he's been able to accomplish over the years, so it's no surprise that he beat us." The race result left Kyle Busch leading the Driver's Championship with 80 points. Kurt Busch, who finished eighth, was second with 77, eight points ahead of Stewart and Allmendinger. Gordon was fifth with 65 points. Ford maintained their lead in the Manufacturers' Championship with 12 points. Toyota and Chevrolet placed second and third with the same number of points, four ahead of Dodge in fourth. 10.36 million people watched the race on television. The race took three hours, one minute and forty-nine seconds to complete, and the margin of victory was 1.137 seconds.

Results

Qualifying

Race results

Standings after the race

Drivers' Championship standings

Manufacturers' Championship standings

Note: Only the top five positions are included for the driver standings.

References

Subway Fresh Fit 500
Subway Fresh Fit 500
NASCAR races at Phoenix Raceway
February 2011 sports events in the United States